The 2018–19 Austrian Hockey League season began on 14 September 2018 and ended on 24 April 2019.  The defending champion were HC Bolzano. On 24 April 2018, EC KAC won the Austrian Hockey Championship for the 31st  time in their history.

Following the regular season, bottom placed KHL Medveščak Zagreb announced they would not be participating in the second phase of the season at the qualifying round due to financial and scheduling difficulties on 28 January 2019. The Qualifying round was reduced to a pool of 5 teams each playing 8 games.

Teams

Standings

Regular season

Placement round

Qualification round

Playoffs

References

External links 

Erste Bank Eishockey Liga Statistics

Austrian Hockey League seasons
Aus
2018–19 in Croatian ice hockey
2018–19 in Italian ice hockey
2018–19 in Hungarian ice hockey
2018–19 in Czech ice hockey